Mount Pandim is a Himalayan mountain located in Sikkim, India.

Pandim appears throughout the trekking trail for Goecha La, starting from Dzongri. It is also one of the prominently seen mountains from Dzongri top and gets closer to the trekking trail as we move towards Goecha La.

Gallery

See also
 List of Ultras of the Himalayas

Notes

Mountains of Sikkim
Six-thousanders of the Himalayas